Scalopocephalus is an extinct genus of therocephalian therapsids from the Late Permian of South Africa. German paleontologist Friedrich von Huene discovered the holotype skull of Scalopocephalus from the Cistecephalus Assemblage Zone in 1924 and named the type species Scalopocephalus watsonianus in 1937. Scalopocephalus is similar in appearance to Scaloposaurus and was first classified in the family Scaloposauridae. Scaloposauridae is no longer recognized as a valid group, and Scalopocephalus is now classified as a basal member of Baurioidea.

References

Baurioids
Therocephalia genera
Lopingian synapsids of Africa
Prehistoric synapsids of Africa
Lopingian genus first appearances
Lopingian genus extinctions